Siyi (四邑, 'Four Counties'), is a region in southern Guangdong province, China

Siyi may also refer to:
Siyi dialect, a branch of Yue Chinese language
Siyi, or Four Barbarians, a historical term for non-Chinese peoples
Siyi, or Four arts, the four accomplishments of the ancient Chinese scholar-gentleman

See also
Sanyi ('Three Counties')